This is a list of all the International team golfers who have played in the Arnold Palmer Cup through 2020. The Arnold Palmer Cup was known as the Palmer Cup until 2015. Until 2002 the United States played Great Britain & Ireland while from 2003 to 2017 the United States played a European team.

Players

Women

 Alyaa Abdulghany 2020
 Kajsa Arwefjäll 2022
 Ana Belac 2019
 Jaravee Boonchant 2018
 Penny Brown 2021
 Carolina Chacarra 2022
 María Fassi 2018
 Isabella Fierro 2021
 Alexandra Forsterling 2022
 Karen Fredgaard 2021
 Sofia Garcia 2019, 2020
 Linn Grant 2020
 Lois Kaye Go 2019
 Sophie Guo 2020
 Leonie Harm 2019
 Jeon Ji-won 2018, 2019
 Wenyung Keh 2018
 Frida Kinhult 2019
 Aline Krauter 2022
 Agathe Laisné 2019, 2021
 Ashley Lau 2022
 Heather Lin 2022
 Ingrid Lindblad 2020, 2021
 Julia Lopez Ramirez 2022
 Hsin-Yu Lu 2022
 Julie McCarthy 2019
 Lorna McClymont 2019, 2022
 Olivia Mehaffey 2018, 2020
 Benedetta Moresco 2022
 Hira Naveed 2019
 Virunpat Olankitkunchai 2021
 Ainhoa Olarra 2018
 Pimnipa Panthong 2018
 Ana Peláez Triviño 2021
 Emily Price 2021
 Pauline Roussin-Bouchard 2020, 2021
 Gabriela Ruffels 2019, 2020
 Chloe Ryan 2018
 Emma Spitz 2020, 2021
 Maja Stark 2020
 Karoline Stormo 2019
 Maddie Szeryk 2018
 Chiara Tamburlini 2022
 Patty Tavatanakit 2018
 Kaleigh Telfer 2020
 Albane Valenzuela 2018
 Beatrice Wallin 2021
 Lauren Walsh 2021
 Dewi Weber 2018
 Amelia Williamson 2022
 Angelina Ye 2020

Men

 Ludvig Åberg 2020, 2022
 Pep Anglès 2014, 2015
 Puwit Anupansuebsai 2020, 2021
 Kengo Aoshima 2019
 Josele Ballester 2022
 Albin Bergstrom 2022
 Fred Biondi 2022
 Jonas Blixt 2007, 2008
 Mark Booker 2000
 David Boote 2016
 David Booth 2012
 Scott Borrowman 2008
 Lars Brovold 2004
 Julien Brun 2012, 2013
 James Byrne 2010
 Jonathan Caldwell 2008
 Jorge Campillo 2007, 2008, 2009
 Alejandro Cañizares 2003, 2004, 2005, 2006
 Sebastian Cappelen 2011, 2012, 2013
 Rowin Caron 2015
 Eugenio Chacarra 2021
 Sam Choi 2020
 Richie Coughlan 1997
 Archie Davies 2022
 Rhys Davies 2004, 2005, 2006, 2007
 Alejandro del Rey 2019
 Thomas Detry 2014, 2015
 Luke Donald 1998, 1999
 Robert Duck 1998
 Adrien Dumont de Chassart 2021, 2022
 Paul Dunne 2014
 Greg Eason 2013
 Kalle Edberg 2005
 Mathias Eggenberger 2015, 2016
 Harry Ellis 2017
 Jamie Elson 2000, 2001
 Nacho Elvira 2011
 Jonas Enander Hedin 2008
 Rhys Enoch 2010
 Scott Fernández 2013
 Gonzalo Fernández-Castaño 2003, 2004
 Mateo Fernández de Oliveira 2022
 Pedro Figueiredo 2013
 Alex Fitzpatrick 2020, 2021
 Angus Flanagan 2020
 Nils Floren 2011
 Oscar Florén 2006, 2007
 Charlie Ford 2008
 Grant Forrest 2014
 Johnny Foster 1999
 Rory Franssen 2017
 Luis Gagne 2018, 2019
 Ricardo Gouveia 2014
 Stuart Grehan 2016, 2017
 Aled Greville 2019
 Stephan Gross 2009
 Mark Haastrup 2006, 2007
 Harry Hall 2017, 2018
 Geoff Harris 2002
 Max Harris 1998, 1999, 2000
 Joel Hendry 2000
 Allan Hill 2021
 Michael Hoey 1999
 Sam Horsfield 2016
 Viktor Hovland 2017, 2018
 Daan Huizing 2012
 Gary Hurley 2013, 2015
 David Inglis 2001, 2003
 Scott Jamieson 2005
 Jin Bo 2021
 Takumi Kanaya 2019
 Jeff Karlsson 2011
 Robert S. Karlsson 2011, 2012
 Justin Kehoe 2001, 2002
 Jesper Kennegård 2010
 David Kitt 2022
 Frederik Kjettrup 2022
 Christo Lamprecht 2022
 Andrew Laurence 1997
 Peter Lawrie 1997
 Martin Le Mesurier 1997
 James Leow 2022
 Steve Lewton 2006
 K. K. Limbhasut 2018
 Lin Yuxin 2020, 2021
 Oliver Lindsay 1998, 1999
 David Lingmerth 2010
 Hurly Long 2018
 Joost Luiten 2006
 Nick Macandrew 2011
 Allan MacDonald 1997
 Graeme Maly 1998
 Stuart Manley 2002
 Richard Mansell 2017
 Pablo Martín 2005, 2006
 Gareth Maybin 2004
 Stefano Mazzoli 2018
 Jack McDonald 2014
 Graeme McDowell 2000, 2001
 Adrian Meronk 2015, 2016
 Francesco Molinari 2004
 Leonardo Motta 2009
 Ronan Mullarney 2018
 Keita Nakajima 2019
 Rasmus Neergaard-Petersen 2022
 Fredrik Niléhn 2017, 2018
 Pär Nilsson 2003
 Keith Nolan 1997
 Alex Norén 2004, 2005
 Henrik Norlander 2009, 2010, 2011
 Vincent Norrman 2020
 David Nyfjäll 2019
 Pontus Nyholm 2021
 Erik Oja 2014
 Pedro Oriol 2007
 Álvaro Ortiz 2018
 Joe Pagdin 2021
 Chris Paisley 2009
 Andrea Pavan 2009, 2010
 Adrien Pendaries 2020
 Julián Périco 2021
 Robin Petersson 2016
 Kevin Phelan 2013
 Peng Pichaikool 2019
 Thomas Pieters 2012
 Mark Power 2020
 David Price 2003
 Oliver Pughe 1998
 David Puig 2020, 2021
 Caolan Rafferty 2020
 Jon Rahm 2014, 2015
 Iván Ramírez 2019
 Richie Ramsay 2006
 Jovan Rebula 2018
 Graeme Robertson 2012
 Simon Robinson 2000
 Martin Rominger 2004
 Hannes Rönneblad 2017
 James Ross 2014
 Max Rottluff 2015
 Phil Rowe 1999, 2000, 2001, 2002
 Antoine Rozner 2016
 Rory Sabbatini 1998
 Lorenzo Scalise 2018
 Wilhelm Schauman 2003
 Matti Schmid 2019, 2020
 Matthias Schwab 2015, 2016
 Robin Sciot-Siegrist 2016
 Sandy Scott 2019
 Gareth Shaw 2007, 2008
 David Skinns 2003, 2005
 Tim Sluiter 2008, 2009
 Andy Smith 2002
 Clément Sordet 2015
 Patrick Spraggs 2010
 Joël Stalter 2013
 Neil Steven 1997
 Kyron Sullivan 1998, 1999, 2000, 2001
 Ben Taylor 2013
 Steven Tiley 2005
 Louis Tomlinson 2014
 Hugo Townsend 2021
 Lars van Meijel 2016
 Kristoffer Ventura 2017
 Justin Walters 2002
 Andrew White 1997, 1999
 David Wicks 2017
 Pontus Widegren 2010, 2011, 2012, 2013
 Oliver Wilson 2001, 2002, 2003
 Stuart Wilson 2001, 2002
 Robin Wingardh 2009
 Gordon Yates 2007
 Yu Chun-an 2019
 Andy Zhang 2018

See also
 List of American Arnold Palmer Cup golfers
 Lists of golfers

References

Europe
Arnold Palmer Cup, Europe